Aegopinella nitidula (previously known as Retinella nitidula) is a species of small land snail, a terrestrial pulmonate gastropod mollusk in the family Gastrodontidae, the glass snails.

Forsyth et al. (2001) review its identification and ecology.

Description
For terms see gastropod shell.

The shell is amber reddish in colour, rarely whitish. It is milky white near the umbilicus. The shell is finely striated with spiral lines producing a fine reticular pattern (less prominent than in A. pura). The apex is strongly convex with 3.5-4.5 convex and regularly increasing whorls. The last whorl is not inflated near the aperture and not descending. The aperture is slightly oblique and the umbilicus is wide. The animal is bluish grey with a lighter sole and bluish black upper tentacles.

Distribution 
This species occurs in these countries amongst others:
 Czech Republic
 Ukraine
 Great Britain
 Ireland
 Canada (Vancouver; introduced)

Habitat
Aegiponella nitidula prefers moderately humid to humid sites in forests, but it can occur in a wide range of habitats, for example hedges, rocks and spring areas.

References

External links
Aegopinella nitidula at Animalbase taxonomy,short description, distribution, biology,status (threats), images

Gastrodontidae
Gastropods described in 1805